Vologdino is a rural locality (a village) in Turgenevskoye Rural Settlement, Melenkovsky District, Vladimir Oblast, Russia. The population was 2 as of 2010.

Geography 
Vologdino is located 29 km northeast of Melenki (the district's administrative centre) by road. Maksimovka is the nearest rural locality.

References 

Rural localities in Melenkovsky District